Jón Árnason may refer to:

 Jón Árnason (bishop of Garðar) (died 1209) 
 Jón Árnason (author) (1819–1888), Icelandic author
 Jón Loftur Árnason (born 1960), Icelandic chess player
 Jón Gunnar Árnason (1931–1989), Icelandic sculptor